Running Out of Time may refer to:

Film 
Running Out of Time (1994 film) or Días contados, a Spanish thriller directed by Imanol Uribe
Running Out of Time (1999 film), a Hong Kong film directed by Johnnie To

Literature
Running Out of Time (novel), a 1996 novel by Margaret Peterson Haddix 
Running Out of Time, a 1993 novel by Betsy Struthers

Music
Running Out of Time, an album by the Daniel Band, 1987

Songs
"Running Out of Time", by Bucks Fizz from Hand Cut, 1983
"Running Out of Time", by Dead Moon
"Running Out of Time", by Hot Hot Heat from Elevator, 2005
"Running Out of Time", by Lil Yachty from Let's Start Here, 2023
"Running Out of Time", by MxPx from Let's Rock, 2006
"Running Out of Time", by Ozzy Osbourne from Down to Earth, 2001
"Running Out of Time", by Paramore from This Is Why, 2023
"Running Out of Time", by Simple Plan from Simple Plan, 2008
"Running Out of Time", by Status Quo from Backbone, 2019
"Running Out of Time", by Tyler, the Creator from Igor, 2019

Other uses
Running Out of Time (relay), a 2022 relay event used to promote discussion about climate change
"Running Out of Time" (Sonic X), a 2004 television episode

See also
Out of Time (disambiguation)
Time Is Running Out (disambiguation)